Parliamentary elections were held in Andorra on 10 December 1989, with a second round of voting on 17 December. Following the elections, Òscar Ribas Reig became Prime Minister, elected on 12 January 1990 by a vote of 23−5.

Electoral system
All 28 seats of the General Council were up for election. Each parish formed a constituency, electing four members each. Members of the Parliament were elected using a two-round plurality voting system. The voting age was 18 years old.

As political parties were not legalised until 1993, all candidates ran as independents, although press and newspapers considered some candidates to be government endorsed (supporting Pintat government) or opponents.

Following the elections, the General Council elected the Prime Minister of Andorra and the General Syndic (speaker).

Results
Voter turnout was 82.3%. A second round of voting was held in Andorra la Vella, Canillo and Ordino.

By affiliation
Although government endorsed candidates won the elections in terms of seats, in the most populated parishes (Andorra la Vella and Escaldes-Engordany), the opposition candidates received more votes. This was seen as a decrease of support of Josep Pintat-Solans's policies, and Òscar Ribas Reig was elected Prime Minister of Andorra.

References

Andorra
Parliamentary election
Parliamentary elections in Andorra
Non-partisan elections
December 1989 events in Europe
Election and referendum articles with incomplete results